Rita Romilly Benson (September 7, 1900 – April 4, 1980) was an American actress and acting teacher.

Biography
Rita Romilly was based in New York City, when she married Martin Benson. She took up dancing and became an actress, after training at the American Academy of Dramatic Arts under its founder, Charles Jehlinger. She did not take a lot of roles before moving on to teaching. Later she became the director of the American Academy of Dramatic Arts. Benson was Paul Robeson's drama coach when he got his role in Othello. Benson was sculpted by Jacob Epstein when she was privately coaching Robeson. Epstein said the following about Benson's as a place where artists and writers gathered, and Paul Robeson sang, and there was no formality of dress or speech. Benson died in New York in 1980.

Sources
 

1900 births
1980 deaths
20th-century American actresses
Actresses from New York City
American Academy of Dramatic Arts alumni